Pete Heat (born Pete Hathway; 17 January 1983) is a UK-based magician and television personality.

Career
Heat starred in the TV shows Around The World In 80 Tricks (Insight, 2016), Secrets Of The Brain (Insight, 2016) and Magic Party (BBC2NI, 2008).

He has also appeared at the Edinburgh Fringe with two shows, "The Magical Adventures Of Pete Heat" and "Miracles Etc".

References

1983 births
Living people
British magicians
British television personalities